The 1950–51 season was Port Vale's 39th season of football in the English Football League, and their sixth full season in the Third Division South. It was the first season to be played at Vale Park, and Roy Sproson also made his debut for the club. In the FA Cup there was excitement as the Vale took rivals Stoke City to a replay in the Fourth Round, only to lose 1–0. It was the last season in the reign of Gordon Hodgson, who died in the summer after long suffering from cancer.

Overview

Third Division South
The pre-season saw expansion for the league, and so the addition of two new teams to the division, nevertheless only one promotion place was available for the 24 teams. For Vale, two attacking players were added to the squad; Syd Peppitt arrived from Stoke City for £4,000, and Roland Lewis was signed from Congleton Town.

The season opened with a 2–0 defeat at Carrow Road, though the real excitement came five days later on 24 August, when Vale Park hosted its first league game; 30,196 turned up to see Newport County beaten 1–0 with a Walter Aveyard goal. The stadium had cost £50,000 and held 40,000 spectators, though work was still needed to complete the covers. Three straight losses followed, and as a result four players were transfer listed. As the weather turned bleak the attendances suffered, as less than a fortnight after its opening the stadium hosted 15,884 fans for the win over Ipswich Town (a reduction of almost 50%). The lack of cover did nothing to encourage fans to show up. Nevertheless the team won six of their opening seven home games, whilst they lost six of their first seven away games. On 28 October they travelled to The Den, where they fought to earn a 2–2 draw with high-flying Millwall, Tommy Cheadle playing on despite breaking three teeth in a hefty collision. On 11 November they drew 1–1 with Gillingham at the Priestfield Stadium, a game which saw the first of Roy Sproson's 842 club appearances.

Results tailed off after Christmas, leaving Vale in a re-election fight by the start of February. This was partly due to an outbreak of flu, which affected eleven of the players. A run of eight wins in eleven games soon allayed any fears of Vale losing their league status. The club were so confident in fact as to sell right-half Bill McGarry to Huddersfield Town for £12,000 – he would later be selected in the England squad for the 1954 FIFA World Cup. Waterlogging of the Vale Park pitch caused numerous games to be postponed, this meant a run of six home games would be played between 23 April and 3 May. This gave young reserves the chance to impress.

They finished twelfth with 45 points, a whole 25 points short of promotion. Cliff Pinchbeck proved to be the only regular scorer, with nineteen goals, though he was on the transfer list at his own request.

Finances
On the financial side, a profit of £5,367 was recorded thanks to a transfer credit of £12,315. Gate receipts had fallen to £27,650, though the wage bill was slashed to £20,063. Leaving the club were new signings Peppitt and Lewis, the former joining Worcester City. On 16 May the club hosted Progrès Niederkorn of Luxembourg, who were on their British tour, Vale won 4–1. After the game 3,000 tons of soil were removed from the stadium, as a new drainage system was installed. On 14 June, manager Gordon Hodgson died following a lengthy battle against cancer, his funeral at Carmountside was conducted by Reverend Norman Hallam. His replacement was Ivor Powell, who was signed as player-manager from Aston Villa.

Cup competitions
In the FA Cup, the "Valiants" progressed past Third Division North New Brighton and Lancashire Combination Nelson with two 3–2 home victories. Drawn against First Division Potteries derby rivals Stoke in the Third Round, it was the first competitive derby game since 1933. Vale showed some 'lively attacking' to achieve a 2–2 draw at the Victoria Ground on 6 January in front of a crowd of 49,500. Vale Park had problems with drainage, and so the replay two days later had to be played at the Victoria Ground as well – this time 40,977 fans showed up. Stoke won by the odd goal from Frank Bowyer, though Vale were consoled by the £2,800 worth of gate receipts they had earned.

League table

Results
Port Vale's score comes first

Football League Third Division South

Results by matchday

Matches

FA Cup

Player statistics

Appearances

Top scorers

Transfers

Transfers in

Transfers out

References
Specific

General

Port Vale F.C. seasons
Port Vale